Talant Turdumamatovich Mamytov; born 14 March 1976) is a Kyrgyz politician who served as acting President of Kyrgyzstan from 2020 to 2021. He is a member of the Supreme Council of Kyrgyzstan and a deputy from the Republic-Ata Zhurt faction. He was elected speaker of the council on November 4, 2020 after the resignation of interim President Sadyr Japarov. Due to the vacancy of the Presidency, the speaker of the council became head of state of Kyrgyzstan.

See also
 List of speakers of the Supreme Council of Kyrgyzstan
 2020 Kyrgyz parliamentary election
 2021 Kyrgyz presidential election
 2020 interim government of Kyrgyzstan
 2020 Kyrgyzstani protests

References

External links
 Government of Kyrgyzstan official site
 Parliament of Kyrgyzstan official site

1976 births
Living people
Chairmen of the Supreme Council (Kyrgyzstan)
Kyrgyzstan